Crosthwaite may refer to:

Places
Crosthwaite, village near Kendal, South Lakeland, Cumbria, England
Crosthwaite and Lyth, civil parish near Kendal, South Lakeland, Cumbria, England
Crosthwaite Parish Church, church in Great Crosthwaite, Keswick, Allerdale, Cumbria, England
Crosthwaite, an ancient parish in Cumbria which contained several places including:
Great Crosthwaite, suburb of Keswick, Allerdale, Cumbria, England
Little Crosthwaite, hamlet in Allerdale, Cumbria, England

People
Adam Crosthwaite (born 1984), Australian cricketer 
Sir Charles Crosthwaite (1835–1915), Chief Commissioner of the British colony of Burma
Hugo Crosthwaite (born 1971), Mexican figurative artist
John Crosthwaite (1925–2010), English race car designer and engineer
Luis Humberto Crosthwaite (born 1962), Mexican writer, editor and journalist
Sir Moore Crosthwaite (1907–1989), British ambassador 
Philip Crosthwaite (1825–1903), Irish-American settler in California
Ralph Crosthwaite (1935–1999), American basketball player
Robert Crosthwaite (1837–1925), Bishop of Beverley